Edwin Milton Yoder, Jr. (born July 18, 1934) is an American journalist and Pulitzer Prize winner.

Life
Yoder was educated at the University of North Carolina at Chapel Hill, graduating in English in 1956.  He then won a Rhodes Scholarship to Jesus College, Oxford, and studied Philosophy, Politics and Economics from 1956 to 1958. While at Oxford, Yoder was a member of the Oxford University basketball team with teammates Willie Morris and Paul Sarbanes. He was then an editorial writer for various newspapers including the Charlotte News, the Greensboro Daily News and the Washington Star.  During his time at the Washington Star, he won the Pulitzer Prize for Editorial Writing in 1979. He has been a columnist on The Washington Post since 1982.  In 1992, he was appointed Professor of Humanities at Washington and Lee University. He was elected to an Honorary Fellowship of Jesus College, Oxford, in 1998.

Publications
The Night of the Old South Ball, and Other Essays and Fables, Oxford, 1984.
The Unmaking of a Whig and Other Essays in Self-Definition, Georgetown University Press, 1990.
Joe Alsop's Cold War: A Study of Journalistic Influence and Intrigue, U. of NC Press, 1995.
The Historical Present: Uses and Abuses of the Past, UP of Mississippi, 1997.
"Blackmail"—winner of Andrew Lytle 2002 Prize in Fiction in the Sewanee Review, fall 2002.
Telling Others What To Think: Recollections of a Pundit, LSU Press, 2004.
Lions at Lamb House, Europa Editions, 2007.

References

External links

Living people
1934 births
University of North Carolina at Chapel Hill alumni
Alumni of Jesus College, Oxford
Pulitzer Prize for Editorial Writing winners
Washington and Lee University faculty
American Rhodes Scholars
The Washington Star people
20th-century American journalists
American male journalists